The Union of Catholic University Students of the Republic of Indonesia (PMKRI), is a nationwide social organisation in Indonesia.

Universities in Indonesia
Catholic student organizations
Christianity in Indonesia
Student organizations in Indonesia
Catholic Church in Indonesia
Student organizations established in 1947